Winner Regional Airport , also known as Bob Wiley Field, is a public airport located one mile (2 km) northeast of the central business district of Winner, a city in Tripp County, South Dakota, United States. The airport is owned by the City of Winner. The airport's FAA location identifier, formerly SFD, was changed on July 5, 2007.

Facilities and aircraft 
For the 12-month period ending June 13, 2007, the airport had 19,800 aircraft operations, an average of 54 per day: 98% general aviation and 2% air taxi.

References

External links 
  at South Dakota Department of Transportation
Airport page at City of Winner web site

Airports in South Dakota
Buildings and structures in Tripp County, South Dakota
Transportation in Tripp County, South Dakota